Major-General Francis Seymour Inglefield  (1855–1930) was a British Army officer.

Military career
Inglefield was commissioned into the 15th Regiment of Foot as a lieutenant on 13 June 1874. The regiment was re-named the East Yorkshire Regiment in 1881, and he was promoted to captain on 30 June 1884, then major on 2 July 1892. After the outbreak of the Second Boer War in South Africa, he served as a special service officer in the Orange Free State February to May 1900 and in the Transvaal May to August 1900, seeing action several times including at the Battle of Poplar Grove on 7 March 1900 and the Battle of Driefontein in March 1900. He was appointed lieutenant-colonel in command of the 2nd battalion of his regiment on 29 April 1900 while in South Africa, and left for home with other officers and men of this battalion in late 1902, after the end of the war. For his service in the war he was twice mentioned in despatches and appointed a Companion of the Distinguished Service Order (DSO). He became a staff officer with the 5th Division in November 1905 and was appointed a Companion of the Order of the Bath in the 1908 Birthday Honours.

He went on to become Commander of 12th Infantry Brigade in July 1909 and General Officer Commanding 54th (East Anglian) Infantry Division in June 1913. He led his division at the landing at Suvla Bay during the Gallipoli Campaign of the First World War and then retired in April 1916.

He was honorary colonel of the East Yorkshire Regiment from 1920 to 1925.

References

|-

1855 births
1930 deaths
British Army major generals
British Army generals of World War I
Companions of the Distinguished Service Order
Companions of the Order of the Bath
East Yorkshire Regiment officers
Francis
British Army personnel of the Second Boer War